This list is of the Cultural Properties of Japan designated in the category of  for the Prefecture of Ibaraki.

National Cultural Properties
As of 1 June 2020, seven Important Cultural Properties have been designated, being of national significance.

Prefectural Cultural Properties
As of 1 April 2020, eight-two properties  have been designated at a prefectural level.

See also
 Cultural Properties of Japan
 List of National Treasures of Japan (paintings)
 Japanese painting
 List of Historic Sites of Japan (Ibaraki)
 Rokkakudō (Kitaibaraki)

References

External links
  Cultural Properties in Ibaraki Prefecture

Cultural Properties,Ibaraki
Cultural Properties,Paintings
Paintings,Ibaraki
Lists of paintings